Chegha Meleh (also Romanized as Cheghā Meleh; also known as Chaughāmale, Cheqāmeleh, Chūghāmeleh, and Chūqām ‘alī) is a village in Jannat Makan Rural District, in the Central District of Gotvand County, Khuzestan Province, Iran. At the 2006 census, its population was 497, in 81 families.

References 

Populated places in Gotvand County